Kawanabe may refer to:

Kawanabe (surname), a Japanese surname
Kawanabe Dam, dam in Kagoshima Prefecture
Kawanabe District, Kagoshima, a former district in Kagoshima Prefecture, Japan
Kawanabe, Kagoshima, a former town in  Kawanabe District